Victoria Moore was an American screenwriter active in Hollywood during the 1920s.

Selected filmography 

 Broadway Daddies (1928)
 Fashion Madness (1928)
 His Rise to Fame (1927)
 The Part Time Wife (1925)
 The Police Patrol (1925)
 A Little Girl in a Big City (1925)

References 

American screenwriters
American women screenwriters
Year of birth missing
Year of death missing